Those Who Fear, also known as TWF, was an American Christian metal band hailing from Pittsburgh, Pennsylvania, who were established in 2005. The groups' current label imprint is Facedown Records. In 2013, the band came out with a studio album called Unholy Anger. Their second studio album was issued in 2014, titled Death Sentence. Their third and Final album, State of Mind, was released in 2016.

Background
In 2005, the band started in Pittsburgh, Pennsylvania with core members: vocalist John Healy and their two lead guitarists, Luke Healy and Trevor Kope. However, the group have gone through many membership changes. At first, the outfit included bassist Scott Buechner, who left the group after the Legacy extended play was released. Two new members were added: drummer Josh Miller and the bassist replacement Josh Ziegler. Nevertheless, the outfit went through a change again prior to Death Sentence being released with Jacob Wilder replacing the departed Josh Miller on drums. Also, bassist Josh Ziegler left the band, then returned later that year. The band released their third album, State of Mind on December 9, 2016. The band performed their final show at Facedown Fest 2017.

Music history
The outfit released a demo project in 2009 with S.O.T.S and it eventually lead to their independently released extended play called Legacy. This got the attention of Facedown Records, who signed the band before the release of Unholy Anger in 2013 making it their first studio album. Just a little over a year later, the band released the second studio album titled Death Sentence. The album had some prowess on a few Billboard charts and those were the Christian Albums and Heatseekers Albums.

Style
Sources have put their music into various genres, everything from deathcore and metalcore to nu metal and hardcore punk. At its core, the music is Christian metal for its sacred elements and heavy metal in its overall sound.

Members

Final lineup
 John Healy – lead vocals (2005–2017)
 Luke Healy – lead guitar (2005–2017)
 Josh Ziegler – bass (2012–2013, 2014–2017)
 Caleb DeRusha – rhythm guitar (2014–2017)
 Jacob Wilder – drums (2014–2017)

Former members
 Scott Buechner – bass (2005–2012)
 Mike Headly – bass
 Josh Miller – drums (2005–2014)
 Trevor Kope – rhythm guitar (2005–2014)

Timeline

Discography

Studio albums

EPs
 Legacy (2011, independent)

Demos
 S.O.T.S. (2009)

Singles
 "Ten Years" (2016)
 "Driven" (2016)

References

2005 establishments in Pennsylvania
American Christian metal musical groups
American Christian rock groups
Facedown Records artists
Musical groups established in 2005
Musical groups from Pittsburgh
Musical groups disestablished in 2017